Lars Roar Langslet (5 March 1936, Nes, Buskerud – 18 January 2016) was the Norwegian Minister of Education and Church Affairs (culture and science affairs only, not church affairs) in 1981, and Minister of Culture and Science from 1982 until 1986 for the Conservative Party.

As Norway has a Lutheran State Church, his ministry had to be divided, since Langslet was a converted Catholic, and hence could not be in charge of the affairs of the state church.

He was a member of the Norwegian Academy for Language and Literature. In 1984 he received the Fritt Ord Honorary Award.

He was appointed a government scholar in 1997. He was one of the editors of Ordet, a quarterly magazine published by Riksmål Society.

References

20th-century Norwegian politicians
1936 births
2016 deaths
People from Nes, Buskerud
Norwegian Roman Catholics
Converts to Roman Catholicism from Lutheranism
Former Lutherans
Conservative Party (Norway) politicians
Ministers of Culture of Norway
Members of the Storting
Members of the Norwegian Academy
Norwegian magazine editors